Jesse Campbell is an American R&B singer. He was a member of Team Christina in the second season of the American television talent show The Voice.

Biography
Starting with gospel music, in 1994 he signed with Underworld / Capitol Records releasing an album entitled Never Let You Go, which reached No. 53 on the Billboard R&B Albums chart. The album spawned two charting singles, "When U Cry I Cry" and "Baby, Baby, Baby". He performed on national television shows such as The Tonight Show and BET's Video Soul. He performed internationally traveling to South and Central America, UK, Eastern Europe, South Africa, Asia, Russia, Belarus, China, Hong Kong, Vietnam, Italy, Denmark, Trinidad & Tobago and Mexico. He also recorded the song "Where Is the Love" for the soundtrack to the film Dead Presidents. Campbell was dropped from the label soon after, but continued singing, performing gospel music.

The Voice (2012)
In 2012, he became a contestant on season two of the American television program The Voice, where he auditioned singing Leon Russell's "A Song for You". All four judges (Adam Levine, CeeLo Green, Christina Aguilera and Blake Shelton) hit the "I Want You" button for him. He chose to be part of the team of Christina Aguilera.

In the Battle round, he was put against Anthony Evans, another R&B/gospel singer. In a duet, they sang the Alicia Keys song "If I Ain't Got You". He won over Evans and advanced to the live shows. He was eliminated later in the competition, during the Live Quarter-Finals after singing "Halo" by Beyoncé

Discography
Albums
1995: Never Let You Go (Capitol Records)
2006: Hymns From the Heart, Vol. 1 (Hiz Records)
2009: Sessions

Singles

References

External links

The Voice (franchise) contestants
Living people
Year of birth missing (living people)
21st-century African-American male singers
People from Maywood, Illinois
21st-century American male singers
21st-century American singers